Pekka Pertti Tukia (born 3 November 1945 in Pihtipudas) is a Finnish mathematician who does research on Kleinian groups and their geometric properties (such as limit sets).

Tukia received his PhD in 1972 with thesis advisor Kaarlo Virtanen in Helsinki. Tukia is a professor at the University of Helsinki.

He made substantial contributions to the collective work of about a dozen mathematicians who proved the Seifert fiber space conjecture. In 1992 he was an invited speaker with talk Generalizations of Fuchsian and Kleinian groups at the European Congress of European Mathematicians in Paris. In 1994 he was an invited speaker with talk A survey of Möbius groups at the International Congress of Mathematicians in Zurich.

Selected publications

with James W. Anderson and Kurt Falk:

References

Living people
Finnish mathematicians
University of Helsinki alumni
Academic staff of the University of Helsinki
1945 births